Robbi Lynn Chong (born May 28, 1965) is a Canadian actress and former model.

Early life
Chong was born on May 28, 1965, in Vancouver, British Columbia, the second daughter of Maxine Sneed and Tommy Chong, an actor, comedian, director and writer. Both parents are biracial: her mother is of Black Canadian and Cherokee descent and her father is half Scotch-Irish, French and half Chinese. Her sister Rae Dawn Chong is also an actress. They have three younger half-brothers (including one who is adopted) and a half-sister from their father's second marriage.

Career 
Robbi Chong studied acting in Los Angeles, California for two years and began appearing frequently on stage and television, working full-time. She was an international cover girl who joined the Click Modeling Agency at age 19 and modeled in Paris from 1983 to 1988.

Filmography

Films 
Cheech & Chong's The Corsican Brothers (1984) as Princess III
Sécurité publique (1987) as Suzannah
Far Out Man (1990) as Dancer
The Evil Inside Me (1993) as Bobbie
Jimmy Hollywood (1994) as Casting Secretary
Ellie Parker (2005) as Acting Student
Shelter (2007) as Receptionist
Only God Can (2015) as Patrice

TV series
The Cosby Show (1988) as Doctor
You Bet Your Life (1992)
Dave's World (1995)
Murder One (1995) as Reporter #4
Poltergeist: The Legacy (1996–1998) as Alexandra Moreau
The Outer Limits (1999, Episode: "Blank Slate") as Hope Wilson
The Outer Limits (1999, Episode: "Star Crossed") as Teresita Arboleda
Red Shoe Diaries 12: Girl on a Bike (2000) (segment "Written Word")
ER (2006) as Sonya Ames

References

External links

 

1965 births
Living people
20th-century Canadian actresses
21st-century Canadian actresses
Actresses from Vancouver
Black Canadian actresses
Canadian film actresses
Canadian people of Cherokee descent
Canadian people of Chinese descent
Canadian people of French descent
Canadian people of Ulster-Scottish descent
Canadian television actresses